Euparagia scutellaris is a species of wasp in the family Vespidae. It is found in the western United States, and larvae feed on weevil larvae.

References

Vespidae
Articles created by Qbugbot
Hymenoptera of North America